Radopholus arabocoffeae is a nematode in the genus Radopholus. It is notable as an early example, along with Radopholus similis, of the alternative flatworm mitochondrial code.

References

Tylenchida